Stadionul Oțelul is a football in Galaţi, Romania. It is currently used mostly for football matches and is the home ground of Oţelul Galaţi.

Gallery

References

External links
Stadionul Oțelul at soccerway.com
Official webpage 

Football venues in Romania
Buildings and structures in Galați